Flavian may refer to:
 A member of the Flavian dynasty of Roman emperors, during the late 1st century AD, or their works
 Flavian Zeija, a Ugandan lawyer, academic and judge. Principal Judge of Uganda, since December 2019.
 A person named Flavianus

Religious leaders
 Flavian, one of the Martyrs of Carthage under Valerian
 Flavian of Ricina (fl. c. 3rd century), bishop in Italy
 Bishops or patriarchs in Asia:
 Flavian I of Antioch (c. 320–404)
 Archbishop Flavian of Constantinople (died 449)
 Patriarch Fravitta of Constantinople (died 489)
 Flavian II of Antioch (died 518)

Ships
, an Italian cruise ship

See also
 Constantinian dynasty, also called the Neo-Flavian dynasty
 Flavian Amphitheater (the Colosseum) 
 Flavia (gens)